D-4-XT-TV is a commercial television station owned by GMA Network Inc. Its transmitter facility is located at Linabo Peak, Lugdungan, Dipolog.

GMA TV-4 Dipolog current programs
 One Mindanao (simulcast on TV-5 Davao)
 At Home with GMA Regional TV (simulcast on TV-5 Davao)

See also
List of GMA Network stations

References

GMA Network stations
Television stations in Zamboanga del Norte
Television channels and stations established in 1998